Dioon rzedowskii is a species of cycad that is native to Oaxaca, Mexico. It occurs in the Rio Santo Domingo valley, near the villages of San Bartolome Ayautla and San Pedro Teutila.

References

External links
 
 

rzedowskii
Plants described in 1980
Flora of Mexico